Blackwood was an electoral district of the Legislative Assembly in the Australian state of Western Australia from 1950 to 1974.

The district was located in the south-west of the state and first contested at the 1950 state election. The seat was abolished ahead of the 1974 state election.

Members for Blackwood

Election results

Blackwood
1950 establishments in Australia
1974 disestablishments in Australia
Constituencies disestablished in 1974
Constituencies established in 1950